Łukasz Janik (born 17 December 1985, in Jelenia Gora) is a Polish Cruiserweight professional boxer.

Career
On 2 November 2013, Janik fought Ola Afolabi for the vacant IBO Cruiserweight title, but lost by majority decision.

On 22 May 2015, Janik loss to WBC Cruiserweight champion Grigory Drozd in his first world title fight.

Professional boxing record 

| style="text-align:center;" colspan="8"|28 Wins (15 knockouts, 13 decisions), 3 Losses (2 knockout), 0 Draws
|-  style="text-align:center; background:#e3e3e3;"
|  style="border-style:none none solid solid; "|Res.
|  style="border-style:none none solid solid; "|Record
|  style="border-style:none none solid solid; "|Opponent
|  style="border-style:none none solid solid; "|Type
|  style="border-style:none none solid solid; "|Rd., Time
|  style="border-style:none none solid solid; "|Date
|  style="border-style:none none solid solid; "|Location
|  style="border-style:none none solid solid; "|Notes
|- align=center
|Loss
|28-4
|align=left| Adam Balski
|
|
|
|align=left| 
|align=left|
|- align=center
|Loss
|28-3
|align=left| Grigory Drozd
|
|
|
|align=left| 
|align=left|
|- align=center
|Win
|28-2
|align=left| Franco Raul Sanchez	
|
|
|
|align=left| 
|align=left|
|- align=center
|Win
|27-2
|align=left| Rico Hoye
|
|
|
|align=left| 
|align=left|
|- align=center
|Loss
|26-2
|align=left| Ola Afolabi
|
|
|
|align=left| 
|align=left|
|- align=center
|Win
|26-1
|align=left| Lukasz Rusiewicz
|
|
|
|align=left| 
|align=left|
|- align=center
|Win
|25-1
|align=left| Lars Buchholz
|
|
|
|align=left| 
|align=left|
|- align=center
|Win
|24-1
|align=left| Ismail Abdoul
|
|
|
|align=left| 
|align=left|
|- align=center
|Win
|23-1
|align=left| Roman Kracik
|
|
|
|align=left| 
|align=left|
|- align=center
|Win
|22-1
|align=left| Cristian Dolzanelli
|
|
|
|align=left| 
|align=left|
|- align=center
|Win
|21-1
|align=left| Prince Anthony Ikeji
|
|
|
|align=left| 
|align=left|
|- align=center
|Win
|20-1
|align=left| Gabor Halasz
|
|
|
|align=left| 
|align=left|
|- align=center
|Win
|19-1
|align=left| Michele De Meo
|
|
|
|align=left| 
|align=left|
|- align=center
|Win
|18-1
|align=left| Mantas Tarvydas
|
|
|
|align=left| 
|align=left|
|- align=center
|Win
|17-1
|align=left| Krisztian Jaksi
|
|
|
|align=left| 
|align=left|
|- align=center
|Win
|16-1
|align=left| Istvan Orsos
|
|
|
|align=left| 
|align=left|
|- align=center
|Loss
|15-1
|align=left| Mateusz Masternak
|
|
|
|align=left| 
|align=left|
|- align=center
|Win
|15-0
|align=left| Silvio Meinel
|
|
|
|align=left| 
|align=left|
|- align=center
|Win
|14-0
|align=left| Marcel Erler
|
|
|
|align=left| 
|align=left|
|- align=center
|Win
|13-0
|align=left| Remigijus Žiaušys
|
|
|
|align=left| 
|align=left|
|- align=center
|Win
|12-0
|align=left| Martin Hudon
|
|
|
|align=left| 
|align=left|
|- align=center
|Win
|11-0
|align=left| Peter Oravec
|
|
|
|align=left| 
|align=left|
|- align=center
|Win
|10-0
|align=left| Leon Nzama
|
|
|
|align=left| 
|align=left|
|- align=center
|Win
|9-0
|align=left| Jean Claude Bikoi
|
|
|
|align=left| 
|align=left|
|- align=center
|Win
|8-0
|align=left| Andrey Zaitsev
|
|
|
|align=left| 
|align=left|
|- align=center
|Win
|7-0
|align=left| Sinisa Puljak
|
|
|
|align=left| 
|align=left|
|- align=center
|Win
|6-0
|align=left| Rachid El Hadak
|
|
|
|align=left| 
|align=left|
|- align=center
|Win
|5-0
|align=left| Mahmud Otazhanov
|
|
|
|align=left| 
|align=left|
|- align=center
|Win
|4-0
|align=left| Jevgēņijs Stamburskis
|
|
|
|align=left| 
|align=left|
|- align=center
|Win
|3-0
|align=left| Tomislav Juric Grgic
|
|
|
|align=left| 
|align=left|
|- align=center
|Win
|2-0
|align=left| Blanchard Kalambay
|
|
|
|align=left| 
|align=left|
|- align=center
|Win
|1-0
|align=left| Abdelhadi Hanine
|
|
|
|align=left| 
|align=left|
|- align=center

References

1985 births
Living people
People from Jelenia Góra
Polish male boxers
Cruiserweight boxers